|}

The Naas Directors Plate Novice Chase is a Grade 3 National Hunt novice chase in Ireland which is open to horses aged five years or older. 
It is run at Naas over a distance of 2 miles and 4 furlongs (4,023 metres) and during the race there are 13 fences to be jumped. It is scheduled to take place each year in March.

The race was first run in 1999 and was awarded Grade 3 status in 2012. It was originally titled the Kilcock Novice Chase and has been run under its present title since 2010.

Records
Most successful jockey (2 wins):
 David Casey -  Donadino (2000), Offshore Account (2007) 
 Davy Condon -  	Zaarito (2010), Prince Erik (2011) 
 Davy Russell - 	Dedigout (2013), Fine Rightly (2015)  
 Bryan Cooper - Bright New Dawn (2014), Ball D'Arc (2017)

Most successful trainer (2 wins): 
 Charlie Swan–  Donadino (2000), Offshore Account (2007) ''

Winners

See also
 List of Irish National Hunt races

References
Racing Post:

National Hunt chases
National Hunt races in Ireland
Naas Racecourse
Recurring sporting events established in 1999